Rachid Belhout (June 14, 1944 – August 9, 2020) was an Algerian football manager and player. At the time of his death, he was managing Al-Ahly Benghazi in the Libyan Premier League.

Personal
Belhout was born on June 14, 1944 in Sétif. At age 4, he moved with his family to France.

Managerial career
Belhout received his coaching license from the Royal Belgian Football Association. He began his career by coaching a number of amateur and semi-professional teams in Belgium and Luxembourg. In 2005, he was appointed as coach of R.E. Virton, who were then playing in the Belgian Second Division.

In 2007, Belhout led USM Alger to the final of the Algerian Cup, where they lost 1-0 to MC Alger.

On December 22, 2010, Belhout was appointed as manager of JS Kabylie. On May 1, 2011, he won the 2010–11 Algerian Cup by beating USM El Harrach 1-0 in the final. On June 26, 2011, Belhout resigned from his position as manager of the club.

On July 19, 2011, Belhout signed a one-year contract with Tunisian club Union Sportive Monastir.
On February 10, 2012, Belhout signed a one-year contract with Algerian club CS Constantine.

Death
Belhout died August 9, 2020, aged 76, after being involved in a traffic collision in Nancy, France.

Honours

Manager
 Won the Tunisian President Cup once with Olympique Béja in 2010
 Won the Algerian Cup once with JS Kabylie in 2011
 Finalist of the Algerian Cup once with USM Alger in 2007

References

External links
Rachid Belhout at Footballdatabase

1944 births
2020 deaths
Footballers from Sétif
Algerian emigrants to France
Expatriate footballers in France
Expatriate footballers in Belgium
Algerian expatriates in Belgium
Algerian footballers
Algerian football managers
Expatriate football managers in Belgium
Expatriate football managers in Tunisia
FC Differdange 03 managers
FC Wiltz 71 managers
R.E. Virton players
JS Kabylie managers
ES Sétif managers
USM Alger managers
ASO Chlef managers
MC El Eulma managers
CS Constantine managers
Al-Ahly SC (Benghazi) managers
Algerian expatriate sportspeople in Tunisia
Algerian expatriates in Libya
Expatriate football managers in Luxembourg
Association football forwards
Road incident deaths in France